Kollamula is a village in Pathanamthitta district in the state of Kerala, India. It is one of the 11 villages in Ranni taluk.

Demographics 
 India census, Kollamula had a population of 22,765 with 11,171 males and 11,594 females. The majority of people are Christians.
Mukkoottuthara is the nearest city in the way of Erumely to Sabarimala.

See also 

 Ranni
 Pathanamthitta

References 

Villages in Pathanamthitta district